Grêmio Esportivo Osasco, commonly referred to as Grêmio Osasco, is a Brazilian professional association football club based in Osasco, São Paulo. The team competes in the Campeonato Paulista Segunda Divisão, the fourth tier of the São Paulo state football league.

They play in blue and yellow shirts, blue shorts and socks.

History
The club was founded on December 17, 2007, by five Osasco inhabitants and Esporte Clube Osasco supporters, who were unsatisfied that the city did not have an official representative in São Paulo soccer.

Rival
Its biggest rival is Audax.

Seasons

State championships/cups

Copa São Paulo de Futebol Júnior (U20)

Stadium
Grêmio Esportivo Osasco play their home games at Estádio José Liberatti. The stadium has a maximum capacity of 11,682 people.

References

External links

   Grêmio Osasco on http://www.futebolpaulista.com.br

 
Association football clubs established in 2007
2007 establishments in Brazil
Osasco